Alt for Norge (All for Norway, though marketed in the United States as The Great Norway Adventure) is a Norwegian reality television series which debuted in 2010 and appears on TVNorge and hosted by Fridtjof Nilsen. The reality show features Norwegian Americans participating in challenges relating to Norwegian history and culture, competing to win a reunion with their distant Norwegian relatives. The original Norwegian concept has also been exported to Sweden and Denmark.

The phrase "Alt for Norge" is the royal motto of Norway.

Seasons
The series is in its 10th season:

 Season 1 - (2010)  
 Season 2 - (2011)
 Season 3 - (2012)
 Season 4 - (2013)
 Season 5 - (2014) 
 Season 6 - (2015)
 Season 7 - (2016)
 Season 8 - (2017) 
 Season 9 - (2018)
 Season 10 - (2019)

The Winner of each season is highlighted in bold.

2010 - Season 01

2011 - Season 02

2012 - Season 03

2013 - Season 04

2014 - Season 05

2015 - Season 06

2016 - Season 07

2017 - Season 08

2018 - Season 09

2019 - Season 10

Season 11 

The 8th of November, 2019, it was announced that there are no plans of an 11th season as of now. For the time being, Season 10 will be known as the last season of Alt for Norge.

References

External links
Official website (in Norwegian)
Alt for Norge Official Facebook page

Norwegian reality television series
2010s Norwegian television series
2010 Norwegian television series debuts
Norwegian-American culture